This is a shortened version of the twelfth chapter of the ICD-9: Diseases of the Skin and Subcutaneous Tissue. It covers ICD codes 680 to 709. The full chapter can be found on pages 379 to 393 of Volume 1, which contains all (sub)categories of the ICD-9. Volume 2 is an alphabetical index of Volume 1. Both volumes can be downloaded for free from the website of the World Health Organization.



Infections of skin and subcutaneous tissue (680–686)
  Carbuncle and furuncle
  Boil, face
  Boil, neck
  Boil, trunk
  Boil, buttock
  Cellulitis and abscess of finger and toe
  Cellulitis and abscess of finger
  Felon
  Paronychia, finger
  Cellulitis and abscess of toe
  Paronychia, toe
  Cellulitis/abscess, unspec. digit
  Other cellulitis and abscess
  Cellulitis/abscess, face
  Cellulitis/abscess, neck
  Cellulitis/abscess, trunk
  Cellulitis/abscess, upper arm
  Cellulitis/abscess, hand
  Cellulitis/abscess, buttock
  Cellulitis/abscess, leg
  Cellulitis/abscess, foot
  Cellulitis/abscess, unspec.
  Lymphadenitis, acute
  Impetigo
  Pilonidal cyst
  Pilonidal cyst w/ abscess
  Pilonidal cyst, unspec.
  Other local infections of skin and subcutaneous tissue
  Pyoderma
  Pyogenic granuloma of skin and subcutaneous tissue

Other inflammatory conditions of skin and subcutaneous tissue (690–698)
  Erythematosquamous dermatosis
  Seborrheic dermatitis NOS (not otherwise specified)
  Cradle cap
  Dandruff
  Atopic dermatitis and related conditions
  Diaper rash
  Eczema, atopic dermatitis
  Contact dermatitis and other eczema
  Contact dermatitis and other eczema due to detergents
  Contact dermatitis and other eczema due to oils and greases
  Contact dermatitis and other eczema due to solvents
  Contact dermatitis and other eczema due to drugs and medicines in contact with skin
  Contact dermatitis and other eczema due to other chemical products
  Contact dermatitis and other eczema due to food in contact with skin
  Contact dermatitis, due to plants
  Contact dermatitis and other eczema due to solar radiation
  Sunburn
  Solar radiation dermatitis
  Disseminated actinic porokeratosis
  Contact dermatitis and other eczema due to other specified agents
  Dermatitis, due to cosmetics
  Dermatitis, due to metals
  Contact dermatitis NOS
  Dermatitis due to substances taken internally
  Dermatitis due to drugs and medicines taken internally
  Dermatitis due to food taken internally
  Bullous dermatoses
  Dermatitis herpetiformis
  Subcorneal pustular dermatosis
  Juvenile dermatitis herpetiformis
  Impetigo herpetiformis
  Pemphigus
  Pemphigoid
  Benign mucous membrane pemphigoid
  Other specified bullous dermatoses
  Unspecified bullous dermatoses
  Erythematous conditions
  Erythema multiforme
  Erythema multiforme, unspecified
  Erythema multiforme minor
  Erythema multiforme major
  Stevens–Johnson syndrome
  Stevens–Johnson syndrome – toxic epidermal necrolysis overlap syndrome
  Toxic epidermal necrolysis
  Other erythema multiforme
  Erythema nodosum
  Rosacea
  Lupus erythematosus
  Psoriasis and similar disorders
  Psoriatic arthropathy
  Other psoriasis and similar disorders
  Parapsoriasis
  Pityriasis rosea
  Pityriasis rubra pilaris
  Other and unspecified pityriasis
  Other psoriasis and similar disorders
  Lichen
  Lichen planus
  Lichen nitidus
  Other lichen not elsewhere classified
  Lichen unspecified
  Pruritus and related conditions
  Pruritus ani
  Pruritus of genital organs
  Prurigo
  Lichenification and lichen simplex chronicus
  Dermatitis factitia
  Pruritus NOS

Other diseases of skin and subcutaneous tissue (700–709)
  Corns and callosities
  Other hypertrophic and atrophic conditions of skin
  Circumscribed scleroderma
  Keratoderma acquired
  Acquired acanthosis nigricans
  Striae atrophicae
  Keloid scar
  Other abnormal granulation tissue
  Other dermatoses
  Actinic keratosis
  Seborrheic keratosis
  Diseases of nail
  Ingrown nail
  Diseases of hair and hair follicles
  Alopecia, unspec.
  Hirsutism
  Disorders of sweat glands
  Prickly heat, heat rash
  Hidradenitis suppurativa
  Diseases of sebaceous glands
  Acne varioliformis
  Other acne
  Sebaceous cyst
  Seborrhea
  Other specified diseases of sebaceous glands
  Unspecified disease of sebaceous glands
  Chronic ulcer of skin
  Decubitus ulcer
  Ulcer, unspec. of lower limb
  Ulcer, skin, chronic, unspec.
  Urticaria
  Urticaria, allergic
  Urticaria, idiopathic
  Urticaria, dermatographic
  Urticaria, unspec.
  Other disorders of skin and subcutaneous tissue
  Dyschromia
  Vitiligo
  Vascular disorders of skin
  Scar
  Degenerative skin disorders
  Foreign body granuloma of skin and subcutaneous tissue
  Other specified disorders of skin
  Unspecified disorder of skin and subcutaneous tissue

International Classification of Diseases